In automata theory, a timed automaton is a finite automaton extended with a finite set of real-valued clocks. During a run of a timed automaton, clock values increase all with the same speed. Along the transitions of the automaton, clock values can be compared to integers. These comparisons form guards that may enable or disable transitions and by doing so constrain the possible behaviors of the automaton. Further, clocks can be reset. Timed automata are a sub-class of a type hybrid automata.

Timed automata can be used to model and analyse the timing behavior of computer systems, e.g., real-time systems or networks. Methods for checking both safety and liveness properties have been developed and intensively studied over the last 20 years.

It has been shown that the state reachability problem for timed automata is decidable, which makes this an interesting sub-class of hybrid automata. Extensions have been extensively studied, among them stopwatches, real-time tasks, cost functions, and timed games. There exists a variety of tools to input and analyse timed automata and extensions, including the model checkers UPPAAL, Kronos, and the schedulability analyser TIMES. These tools are becoming more and more mature, but are still all academic research tools.

Example 
Before formally defining what a timed automaton is, some examples are given.

Consider the language  of timed-words  over the unary alphabet  such that there is an  during the first time unit, and there is less than one time unit between two successive . The timed automaton recognizing this language, pictured nearby, use a single clock , which should never be equal to one. This clock counts the time since the start of the run if no  were emitted, or from the last  emitted otherwise.

If it is not the case, it accepts the run, otherwise it rejects it. In this case, a  can not be emitted if the clock is at least equal to one, and thus the run fails.

Formal definition

Timed automaton 
Formally, a timed automaton is a tuple  that consists of the following components:
  is a finite set.
   is the set of start locations.
  is the set of accepting locations.

Extended state 
A pair with a location  and a clock valuation  is called either an extended state or a state.

Here lies one of the biggest difference between timed-automata and finite automata. In a finite automaton, at some point of the execution, the state is entirely described by the number of letter read and by a finite number of possible values, which are actually called "states". That means that, given a state and a suffix of the word to read, the remaining of the run is totally determined. Thus, the word "finite" in the name "finite automata". However, as it is explained in the section "run" below, in order to resume clocks are used to determine which transitions can be taken. Thus, in order to know the state of the automaton, you must both know in which location you are, and the clock valuation.

Run 
 (initialization) 
 we assume that  time units passed, and at this time, the guard is satisfied. I.e.  satisfies ,
Formally, .

The notion of accepting run is defined as in finite automata for finite words and as in Büchi automata for infinite words. That is, if  is finite of length , then the run is accepting if . If the word is infinite, then the run is accepting if and only if there exists an infinite number of position  such that .

Deterministic timed automaton 
As in the case of finite and Büchi automaton, a timed-automaton may be deterministic or non-deterministic. Intuitively, being deterministic has the same meaning in each of those case. However, in the case of timed-automaton the formal definition is slightly more complex. Formally, a timed-automaton is deterministic if:
  is a singleton

Closure property 
The class of languages recognized by non-deterministic timed automata is:
 closed under union, indeed, the disjoint union of two timed automata recognize the union of the language recognized by those automata.
 closed under intersection.
 not closed under complement.

Problems and their complexity 
The computational complexity of some problems related to timed automata are now given.

The emptiness problem for timed automaton can be solved by constructing a region automaton and checking whether it accepts the empty language. This problem is PSPACE-complete.

The universality problem of non-deterministic timed automaton is undecidable, and more precisely Π. However, when the automaton contains a single clock, the property is decidable, however it is not primitive recursive. This problem consists in deciding whether every words are accepted by a timed-automaton.

See also  
 Alternating timed automaton: an extension of timed automaton with universal transitions.

Notes 

Automata (computation)